Ace Books have published hundreds of western titles, starting in 1952.  Most of these were Ace Doubles (dos-à-dos format), but they also published a few single volumes.  Between 1952 and 1968, the books had a letter-series identifier; after that date they were given five digit numeric serial numbers.  There are 38 number-series western titles in the list below, but it may be incomplete.

The list given here gives a date of publication; in all cases this refers to the date of publication by Ace, and not the date of original publication of the novels.  For more information about the history of these titles, see Ace Books, which includes a discussion of the serial numbering conventions used and an explanation of the letter-code system.

04745 WE Edgar Rice Burroughs The Bandit of Hell's Bend
14194 WE Nelson Nye Death Valley Slim
14198 WE John Bickham Decker's Campaign
14240 WE Wayne C. Lee Die-Hard
14247 WE Edgar Rice Burroughs The Deputy Sheriff of Comanche County
22725 WE Nelson Nye Hellbound for Ballarat (1970)
28911 WE Edgar Rice Burroughs The Girl from Hollywood
29741 WE Todhunter Ballard Gold in California (1965)
29743 WE Todhunter Ballard Gold in California (1965)
30710 WE Giles A. Lutz Gun Rich
32575 WE Charles O. Locke The Hell Bent Kid
48877 WE Giles A. Lutz The Lonely Ride
48918 WE Nelson Nye Long Run
51642 WE Ray Hogan The Man from Barranca Negra
52740 WE L.P. Homes The Maverick Star (1969)
54460 WE Edgar Rice Burrough The Mucker (1974)
64512 WE Edgar Rice Burroughs The Outlaw of Torn
67131 WE L. L. Foreman Plundering Gun
71076 WE Clifton Adams Reckless Men
71816 WE Edgar Rice Burroughs The Return of the Mucker
72280 WE Edgar Rice Burroughs The Rider
72360 WE John Callahan Ride the Wild Land & Jernigan (1965)
73425 WE L. L. Foreman Rogue's Legacy (1968)
75617 WE Ray Hogan Showdown on Texas Flat
76015 WE Robert Mccaig The Shadow Maker (1970)
76181 WE Louis L'Amour (as Jim Mayo) Showdown at Yellow Butte
77520 WE Wayne Lee Son of a Gunman
77918 WE James Powell Stage to Seven Springs
78830 WE Giles A. Lutz The Stranger
79805 WE Roy Manning Tangled Trail
80400 WE Nelson Nye The Texas Gun
80575 WE Nelson Nye Thief River
82401 WE Ernest Haycox Trigger Trio
82410 WE D.B. Newton Triple Trouble
82430 WE Nelson Nye Trouble At Quinn's Crossing
88010 WE T.V. Olsen Westward They Rode
90426 WE Lee Hoffman Gunfight at Laramie
90701 WE Robert J. Hogan The Wolver

References 
Ace Image Library.  Contains images of most covers for both the singles and doubles.
Bookscans.  Contains numerous images of the Ace covers.

Western numeric-series single titles